Daffy's Diner is a 1967 Warner Bros. Merrie Melodies cartoon directed by Robert McKimson. The short was released on January 21, 1967, and stars Daffy Duck and Speedy Gonzales. It was the final Warner Bros. cartoon to be produced by DePatie–Freleng Enterprises.

Plot
Daffy runs a diner near Guadalajara, serving mouseburgers with rubber mice as substitutes for actual mice, as he hasn't seen one in ages. However, one angry cat discovers the trick and demands a real mouseburger. So by gunpoint, Daffy goes to find a mouse. At this point, Daffy encounters Speedy, begging for food, who he tries to cook.

The mouse discovers his intentions and escapes to the desert, with Daffy in hot pursuit. Daffy is foiled each time by Speedy running up a cactus, Daffy accidentally knocking a cactus on himself, and being scared by Speedy into a trash can, prompting the waste management official to think he has gone crazy after Daffy tells him to put him down from within the can. (Speedy also doesn't appear for the rest of the short after that.)

Daffy returns and tries to escape, but the cat stops him. Finally, the cat demands his burger within two minutes, forcing Daffy to serve himself as a replacement. He states, "You never know what you'll do, until you've got a gun pointed at your head" (which was almost the same line Daffy used in Golden Yeggs).

References

External links
 

1967 animated films
1967 short films
Films directed by Robert McKimson
Daffy Duck films
Speedy Gonzales films
Merrie Melodies short films
Warner Bros. Cartoons animated short films
1960s Warner Bros. animated short films
1960s English-language films
American animated short films
Films about ducks
Animated films about mice
Animated films about cats